The Local Government Act 2000 (c.22) is an Act of the Parliament of the United Kingdom that reformed local government in England and Wales.  Its principal purposes are:

 to give powers to local authorities to promote economic, social and environmental well-being within their boundaries
 to require local authorities to shift from their traditional committee-based system of decision-making to an executive model, possibly with a directly elected mayor (subject to approval by referendum), and with a cabinet of ruling party group members
 to create a consequent separation of functions with local authorities, with backbench councillors fulfilling an overview and scrutiny role
 to introduce a revised ethical framework for local authorities, requiring the adoption of codes of conduct for elected members and standards committees to implement the codes of conduct; the introduction of a national Standards Board and Adjudication Panel to deal with complaints and to oversee disciplinary issues
 to require each local authority to produce a publicly available constitution

The introduction of directly elected mayors (leaders) was the most radical innovation in the Act. To 2017, 53 referendums have been held, 16 of which have agreed with so resulted in an elected mayor (directly elected leader) option.  The role of all other mayors is a charitable councillor, somewhat as a figurehead, in ceremonial occasions wearing the civic regalia and sometimes as chairman of events, usually co-opted to serve outside of their duties as councillor for one year only, the most powerful example of which is the Lord Mayor of London.  Directly elected mayors resemble the old borough mayors of Great Britain, before reform by corporations and legislation, and some European equivalent empowered figures.

Options for council executive forms
The act, as amended, stipulates that the executive of a local authority must take one of the following forms:

Leader and cabinet executive
Mayor and cabinet executive
Alternative arrangement (Section 31) (referred to as a Section 31 arrangement, most commonly seen in coalitions of political parties)

A mayor and council manager (fourth) option was repealed by the Local Government and Public Involvement in Health Act 2007.

Changes made by the Localism Act 2011 made it possible for larger authorities (more than 85,000 population) to adopt a committee system of governance.

External links

The Local Government Act 2000, as originally enacted, from the Office of Public Sector Information.
Explanatory notes to the Local Government Act 2000 from the Office of Public Sector Information.

Local government legislation in England and Wales
United Kingdom Acts of Parliament 2000